Abracadabra is a 1952 Italian comedy film directed by Max Neufeld and starring Mario Riva, Riccardo Billi and Lilia Landi. It was shot at Cinecittà Studios in Rome. The film's sets were designed by the art directors Alfredo Montori and Camillo del Signore.

Plot
Three crooks scheme to swindle a wealthy widow out of her fortune, but their plans are thwarted by the sudden return of her husband who is far from dead.

Cast
Mario Riva as Amleto
Riccardo Billi as Antonio
Lilia Landi as Carmela
Guglielmo Inglese	as Nicola Caiazzo
Alberto Sorrentino as	Fernando, detto Fefè
Paul Muller as Alfredo
Marcella Rovena as Cesira Caiazzo
Simona Gori as Maria
 as Antonietta
Marco Tulli as	Il maggiordomo
Silvio Bagolini as	Il signore balbuziente
Bruno Corelli as Il Decio
Pietro Tordi as Giacomo

References

External links

1952 comedy films
Italian comedy films
Films directed by Max Neufeld
Films shot at Cinecittà Studios
Italian black-and-white films
1950s Italian films